Bhabiji Ghar Par Hain! ( Is Sister-in-law At Home?) sometimes abbreviated as BGPH is an Indian Hindi sitcom that premiered on 2 March 2015 on &TV and is digitally available on ZEE5. The series is produced by Binaifer Kohli under the banner of Edit II Productions.

This comedy show revolves around two neighbouring couples, the Mishras and the Tiwaris, in which the husbands are attracted to each other's wives and attempt various ultimately unsuccessful and hilarious techniques to impress them.

Since its inception, the show has garnered positive reviews and acclaim from the critics and viewers alike. Bhabiji Ghar Par Hain! is inspired by the 1990s Hindi sitcom Shrimaan Shrimati.

Plot
The show takes place in the fictional "Modern Colony" located in Kanpur and revolves around two neighbouring couples. The husbands, Vibhutinarayan Mishra and Manmohan Tiwari, have been married for seven years and are bored with their marriages and are smitten by each other's wives, unbeknownst to each other. Manmohan Tiwari is a successful undergarment businessman, whose wife Angoori Tiwari is a simple and naive housewife. Their neighbour, Vibhutinarayan Mishra, was once an unsuccessful insurance agent and is now unemployed. Often called "Nalla" (slang for being unemployed), he spends most of his time doing household chores. On the other hand, his wife Anita Mishra is a headstrong, smart, modern lady who runs grooming classes. She is the breadwinner of the family and despises her husband's unemployment and laziness.

Their houses are in opposite directions across the street, with the Tiwaris residing in House no. 6 and the Mishras living in House no. 9. The Tiwari's have their own house while the Mishras live in a rental house that belonged to Anita's uncle. Most of the plot takes place at their respective homes. The characters also visit a nearby tea stall 'Gupta Tea Center' where they mostly discuss their ongoing lives and general affairs. As both the men devise schemes to impress each other's wives (Angoori and Anita), they pull each other down and create problems for others.

Cast

Main
Aasif Sheikh as Vibhuti Narayan Mishra (Vibhu), an unsuccessful insurance agent. Anita's husband, David's nephew and Helen's son. Often called 'Nalla' for being jobless, he has fallen for the simple-minded Angoori Tiwari. He is known to be highly educated but still won't do a regular job out of his ego. His plans to woo Angoori usually fails due to her naivety and this puts him in dire situations. He hates Manmohan Tiwari because he thinks Tiwari doesn't deserve a wife like Angoori who puts him above anything else. He has tried numerous times to degrade Tiwari's image in front of Angoori to negative results. Although he claims to be 'Chhapra University Topper', his Uncle David Mishra revealed that he bought the degree for him during his college.
 Rohitash Gaud as Manmohan Tiwari, a successful undergarments businessman, who is attracted to the modern and elegant Anita Mishra. He is Ramkali's elder son, Laddu's elder brother, Anu's nephew and Angoori's husband. He is called Kaccha-Baniyaan (crude words for undergarments) by Vibhuti because he thinks Tiwari's business is disgraceful.
 Shilpa Shinde as Angoori Manmohan Tiwari (2015 – March 2016) – Shinde left the series after a dispute with the series' producer, Binaifer Kohli and former channel head Vikas Gupta./
Shubhangi Atre Poorey (March 2016 – present) as Angoori Manmohan Tiwari – She is a traditional Indian housewife who likes to wear lehenga style saree, sindoor and mangalasutra and has a Bhojpuri accent. She is gullible, kind-hearted and innocent. She is Manmohan's wife, Bhoorey Lal's daughter and Puttan's elder sister. She performs various superstitious rituals sometimes told to her by her loving mother-in-law which leads to hilarious outcomes.
 Saumya Tandon as Anita Vibhuti Narayan Mishra (Annu) (2015 – 2020), an elegant, modern lady who leads grooming classes in Kanpur. She is also a black belt in karate and employs these skills self defence. She is Danny's daughter and Mark Shutermurg's cousin sister. To fulfill her romantic fantasies, she constantly forces Vibhuti to perform various characters like a thief, a robber, a college stud, a painter, a dacoit, an electrician, a cop among many others which most of the times frustrates him. She has a good friendship with Angoori. She is hated by Vibhuti's family especially Helen and David. On 21 August 2020, Tandon revealed via her social media accounts that she has opted to not renew her contract and has quit the show.
Neha Pendse as Anita Vibhuti Narayan Mishra (Anu) (2021 –2022), Pendse replaced Tandon in February 2021. Pendse quit the show a year later, in February 2022. 
Vidisha replaced Pendse in March 2022.

Recurring
 Saanand Verma as Anokhelal Saxena, more popularly known as Saxena Ji. He electrocutes himself, is tortured and eats poisonous or unhealthy items such as lizard soup and cockroach tea, then insanely exclaims "I Like It!". He is shown to possess various talents like being a lawyer, an artist, an actor, a writer, a singer, etc.
 Yogesh Tripathi as Daroga Happu Singh, a corrupt Daroga (police inspector) who has a secret crush on Anita whom he calls 'Gori Mem' (meaning "Fair Ma'am"). He often demands bribes. He thrashes Tillu, Tika and Malkhan at the tea stall for their antics.
 Kishore Bhanushali as Resham Pal Singh, the Commissioner of Kanpur Police Department. He is honest and dislikes Happu Singh's corrupt antics. Actor Kishore Bhanushali has been a lifelong impersonator of the late Indian film actor Dev Anand and he brings his characteristics to this role. He has also appeared as another character 'Sharma Uncle' in a one-hour horror special episode previously before taking on this character later.
 Vaibhav Mathur as Tika Ram, an unemployed dimwit who often accompanies Tillu and Malkhaan. The trio live in a rented place.
Deepesh Bhan as Malkhan Singh: He and his two friends try to earn money through chitfunds, kidnapping, selling stolen items, fraud and other means but are often caught and jailed. He often flirts with girls.
Deepesh Bhan passed away on 23 July 2022. It is currently unknown whether the character of Malkhan will be retired or another actor will take his place.
 Syed Salim Zaidi as Tillu, Tiwari's shop employee who constantly plots against him to acquire his six months of unpaid salary. To extort his salary from his boss, he has robbed Tiwari's house, made threatening calls and kidnapped Tiwari's younger brother, but always fails.
 Soma Rathod as Ramkali Tiwari (Ammaji), Tiwari's strict mother who frequently beats him for his mistakes and loves her daughter-in-law, Angoori. Amma Ji is an avid follower of a famous astrologer and priest, Pundit Ramphal. He suggests her various rituals which in turn Amma Ji makes Angoori perform to get health and wealth-related benefits. Amma Ji's relationship with Pundit Ramphal's insinuate that he is Manmohan Tiwari's actual biological father.
 Vishwajeet Soni as Prem Chaudhary, Vibhuti's best friend who is a foul-mouthed cunning show-off and an impersonator of Indian film actor Prem Chopra. He gambles and smuggles.
 Akshay Patil as Pelu Chaurasia, the colony's mute rickshaw puller. He communicates by pulling out message slips out of his muffler tied around his head. He is known for his intelligence. He carries a portable radio, providing songs appropriate to often hilarious situations.
 Anup Upadhyay as David Mishra: Vibhuti's UK-based dubiously rich uncle who visits him in awkward situations. Whenever he visits Vibhuti, he brings papers to his ₹20 crore property, so he can name Vibhuti his heir. But, due to one reason or another, he and sometimes others, too, shred the papers.
 Jeetu Gupta as Dr. Gupta, a doctor who is basically a "tantrik", as he always tells people. He performs black magic on his patients to cure them because his prescriptions almost never work.
 Rakesh Bedi as Bhoorey Lal, Angoori's alcoholic but loving father. He hates Tiwari for marrying her by lying about his business profession.
 Vijay Kumar Singh as Master Bhoop Singh. He is a Masterji (teacher) in Ladoo's school. Bhoop Singh is a believer of strict Indian moral values or "Sanskar" as he calls them. In the show, he is the caricature of old-fashioned teachers from rural India. He wears khadi jacket, carries an Indian-style side-bag called "Jhola" and always has a long and thin bamboo stick called "Santi" to beat those who misbehave. When he witnesses improper behaviour in public, he recites his catchphrase, Sanskar naam ka cheez hai ki nahi? lit. (Do you have any moral values or not?).
 Falguni Rajani as Gulfam Kali, (2015-2020) an infamous tawaif (courtesan) of Kanpur. She knows the male characters' secrets and uses these to manipulate them. Rajani quit the show in September 2020.
 Khushboo Kamal as Badami, Gulfam Kali's younger sister/Pammi Leoni
 Shekhar Shukla as Panditji: A disciple of pundit Ramphal (2015)
 Saurabh Kaushik replaced Shukla in the role (2016-prsent)
 Hardik Gohil as Laddoo Tiwari, who is the younger brother of Manmohan Tiwari and Ramkali's younger son. He has a subtle-telepathic ability and perceives others' thoughts.
 Feroz as Chhedi, a flirting Dhobi (washerman) of the locality
 Rajeev Mehra as various characters including a Minister of Uttar Pradesh and also as Makkhmal Makwana, the new police commissioner who had temporarily replaced Resham Pal Singh but was demoted for corruption.
 Nitin Jadhav as Manohar the constable
 Manoj Santoshi (writer of Bhabiji Ghar Par Hain!) has appeared as various characters.
 Sandeep Anand as Puttan: Angoori's brother who is a thief
 Manju Brijnandan Sharma (2015-2016) / Pratima Kazmi (2020–present): as Helen Ahuti Narayan Mishra, Vibhuti's mother
 Akshita Sethi as Meenal: Anurag's wife, Anita's best friend, Vibhuti's college friend
 Ishwar Singh as Anurag: Minal's husband, Anita, Vibhuti's friend
 Anang Desai as Danny Sharma: Anita's NRI father who disapproves Vibhuti because of their love marriage
 Praful Chauhan as Yaad Ram's son
 Anup Kumar Singh as Pundit Ramphal, the famous astrologer and priest whom Ammaji blindly follows. Anup Kumar Singh has also appeared as various other characters before and after, such as government officials such as CBI officer, IT officer and TTE Namepal Singh from episodes 474 to 476.
 Naveen Bawa as various characters, including businessman Bhushan Bhabhuta from Bhabhuta Builders in episodes 276 to 278 and Anita's American cousin brother Mark Shutermurgh in episodes 682 through 686
 Sohit Vijay Soni as News Anchor and other characters.
 Anu Awasthi as Anu Awasthi (Anu Mama) Ramkali's brother, Manmohan Tiwari's uncle
 KK Goswami as various characters
 Liliput as Maamulal Chaurasiya, Vibhuti's Mamaji (mother's brother) who suffers from haemorrhoids and is led to believe that Vibhuti is a doctor.
Mithilesh Chaturvedi as various characters (2016-2019)
 Navin Prabhakar as the mentally unstable Kavi (poet) Pramod Pralay Jhangirabadi who has been in love with Anita since college days. He again appeared briefly as a short-tempered musician Jaleel Chaudhary.
 Pranay Dixit as various characters
Charul Malik as Misti Mukherjee (2018) / Rusa (2021–present): The commissioner's sister-in-law
Sumit Arora as various characters (2021–present)

Guests
 Kumar Sanu as Kumar Sanu.
 Alka Yagnik as Alka Yagnik.
 Ranveer Singh promoted Bajirao Mastani in Episode 209.
 Arjun Kapoor promoted Ki & Ka in Episode 285.
 Ritesh Deshmukh, Vivek Oberoi and Urvashi Rautela promoted Great Grand Masti in Episode 363.
 Brett Lee promoted UnIndian in Episode 381.
 Sunny Leone as part of Bhabi ji Ghar Par Hai!: Sunny Leone Special in episodes 417-421
 Shaan promoted The Voice India (Season 2) in Episode 466.
 Akshay Kumar promoted Jolly LLB 2 in Episode 510.
 Varun Dhawan and Alia Bhatt promoted Badrinath Ki Dulhania in Episode 530.
 Anushka Sharma promoted Phillauri in Episode 540.
 Akshay Kumar promoted Toilet: Ek Prem Katha (as part of Bhabi ji Ghar Par Hai!: Toilet Special) in Episode 639.
 Ayushmann Khurrana and Kriti Sanon promoted Bareilly Ki Barfi in Episode 645.
 Varun Dhawan promoted Judwaa 2 in Episode 671.
 Nitin Goswami promoted Siddhi Vinayak in Episode 692.
 Lara Dutta and Ahmed Khan promoted the reality dance show High Fever - Dance Ka Naya Tevar in Episode 806.
 Krushna Abhishek and Nazia Hussain promoted Teri Bhabhi Hai Pagle in Episode 877.
 Akshay Kumar promoted Gold in Episode 902.
 Salman Khan for Bharat Promotion
 Katrina Kaif for Bharat promotion

Background and production

Development and writing
After the launch of &pictures in November 2014, ZEE network launched its second channel under the "&" network brand, "&tv", to be launched in March 2015. 
The channel's original content line-up was announced in early 2015 with "Bhabiji..." included, announced as a light-hearted comedy sitcom. All promos were featured on ZEE. The channel intended to place "Bhabiji..." in a late-night slot as a comedy show for adults.

Casting
Before the show went into production, Rashmi Desai was chosen to play the character of 'Angoori'. But Desai rejected the role because of age differences between her and co-actor Rohitash Gaud and the role went to Shilpa Shinde. Actor Aasif Sheikh revealed that before production started, he suggested the makers cast Shilpa Shinde, when he heard about the character of 'Angoori' for the first time.

After one year in April 2016, approximately 80 actresses auditioned for the role of Angoori and Shubhangi Atre was selected after the unexpected exit of Shinde from the series.

Filming
The set of Bhabiji Ghar Par Hain! is located in Naigaon.

In October 2016, film actress Sunny Leone came in for a sequence shoot on the set of Bhabiji Ghar Par Hai!. While on set, she refused to say Angoori's catchphrase "Sahi Pakde Hain" ("You got it right!") as she thought it has a vulgar meaning. It took approximately one hour for the makers to convince her that Angoori says this line in literal context and that it has no vulgar meaning and the shoot was resumed.

In March 2018, the show's entire cast and crew went to Goa, a beach holiday destination, to celebrate the show's third anniversary and shot an entire story sequence named 'Kanpur To Goa'.

Music
The "BhabiJi Rap Song" was sung, composed and written by Anmol Malik and Raftaar. The soundtrack for the serial was released on 25 February 2017 by Zee Music Company.

Themes and analysis
The show, while having a more adult premise than most other Indian TV shows, tried to defy the gender expectations of a female character on the show, according to the female lead Saumya Tandon. While explaining the norms of Indian television industry, she said:

In August 2018, Shubhangi Atre said audiences want a wife-like character Angoori.

Specials
In November 2016, the show was extended by one more day, named "Bhabiji Ghar Par Hai Shanivaar Special" in which celebrities visit the sets. Nine Shanivaar Special episodes were aired on Saturdays, with celebrity guest stars appearing as part of a plot woven around them and were subsequently interviewed by the main cast. A 'Sunday Horror Special' was aired in June 2016.

 Episode 1: Govinda
 Episode 2: Karan Singh Grover and Bipasha Basu
 Episode 3: Ranjeet and Shakti Kapoor
 Episode 4: Kumar Sanu and Alka Yagnik
 Episode 5: Ravi Kishen
 Episode 6: Jimmy Shergill
 Episodes 7 & 8: Jackie Shroff
 Episode 9: New Year Special, featuring actors from various TV shows of &TV
 Episode 10: 1 Hour Horror Special, Ep 341 on 19 June 2016

Adaptations

Spin-off
In 2017, it was reported the show will be adapted for British and Anglo-Spanish audiences, produced by ZEE Studios under the title Love Thy Neighbor. A spin-off titled Happu Ki Ultan Paltan, based upon the character of Daroga Happu Singh, had been green-lighted by And TV in late 2018. The spin-off revolves around Happu's domestic life not seen in "Bhabiji Ghar Par Hain!". The show premiered on 4 March 2019.

Reception

Critical reception
Since the show's inception in 2015, it has garnered positive reviews and acclaim from the critics and viewers alike. In 2015, TVR ratings confirmed that Bhabiji Ghar Par Hai! had higher viewership than the popular reality show Bigg Boss, which had the same time-slot and was hosted by actor Salman Khan. Bhabiji Ghar Par Hai! is one of the most-watched sitcoms in Pakistan.

In a 2016 interview, the show's director Shashank Bali acknowledged that when Shilpa Shinde left the show and Shubhangi Atre was roped in for the role of 'Angoori', the show's ratings declined. He said, "Viewers were so involved with the original cast. When Shilpa got replaced, the connection broke with the viewers; hence we dropped in numbers. Now we have again recovered the original rating".

In 2017, the show's publicity was questioned when co-actress, Shilpa Shinde participated in Bigg Boss. In an interview, a reporter asked actor Aasif Sheikh whether Shilpa Shinde's participation in Bigg Boss 11 publicised the show, to which Aasif Sheikh replied, "Our show is doing good, which is what matters. Publicity is publicity whether it is good or bad".

According to DNA, Bhabiji Ghar Par Hai! is a top-ranking sitcom on local primetime television. In 2018, union minister Kiren Rijiju in his tweet, stated he and his wife are enthusiastic followers of Bhabhiji Ghar Par Hai!

Catchphrases used by the characters, particularly Angoori's "Sahi Pakde Hain", Vibhuti's "I am sa-a-ah-ree (a humorously exaggerated take on "sorry")...I'm really, really sah-ree", that of Saxena Ji's "I like it", Happu Singh's "Arre Dada" and Masterji's "Sanskar naam ka cheez hai ki nahi" have become popular outside the show.

Aasif Sheikh who plays the role of Vibhuti Narayan Mishra in the show has been acknowledged by World Book of Records London for Performing More than 300 Different Characters in a single running Television show on 19 October 2021.

Awards and nominations
Indian Telly Awards

|-
| rowspan="7"| 2015 || Shilpa Shinde || rowspan="2"|Best Actress in a Comic Role || 
|-
| Saumya Tandon || 
|-
| Rohitash Gaud || rowspan="2"|Best Actor in a Comic Role || 
|-
| Aashif Sheikh || 
|-
| Shashank Bali || Best Director (Sitcom) || rowspan="3" 
|-
| Manoj Santoshi || Best Dialogue Writer (Sitcom or Comedy) 
|-
| Raghuvir Shekhawat || Best Screenplay Writer (Sitcom/Comedy) 
|}

Indian Television Academy Awards

|-
| rowspan="7"| 2016 || Shubhangi Atre || rowspan="2"|Best Actress – Comedy || 
|-
| Saumya Tandon || 
|-
| Aashif Sheikh || rowspan="2"|Best Actor – Comedy || 
|-
| Rohitash Gaud || 
|-
| Shashank Bali || Best Director – Comedy (Jury) || rowspan="2" 
|-
| Manoj Santoshi || Best Dialogues (Jury) 
|}

Controversy
In March 2016, actress Shilpa Shinde unexpectedly left the show. Shinde made several allegations against producers Benaifer Kohli, Sanjay Kohli, co-actress Saumya Tandon, and &TV programming head Vikas Gupta. Shinde stated that she was forced to leave the show and was owed  lakh (3.2 million rupees). Benaifer Kohli responded in September 2016 that Shinde's salary had twice been raised in the past as per her demand.

The matter was taken to Cine and TV Artists Association (CINTAA) and soon after that, Edit II Productions dispatched a legal document to Shinde for her unexplained absence from the production, which continued.

Shinde mentioned that the makers favoured Tandon over her, citing lack of personal staff for her. Benaifer Kohli denied the discrimination claim and said that she never refused any demand from Shinde regarding her costumes, jewellery or make-up. Tandon stated: "At the beginning of the show when I signed the contract, I had made it clear to the producers that I will manage my own designer and make-up".

On 3 March 2016, Sanjay Kohli announced that the show would replace Shinde, whom he accused of unprofessional behaviour. Shinde stated &TV falsely accused her of unprofessionalism because she refused to sign a new contract with a clause that she not portray a character like Angoori in the future. Binaifer Kohli demanded approximately 12 crore (120 million rupees) from Shinde, citing breach of contract as Shinde was trying to work on another show. Shinde said there was no such clause and accused Kohli of contract-tempering.

In March 2017, Shinde filed a First Information Report (FIR) against Sanjay Kohli, whom she accused of sexual harassment. According to the FIR: 

Shinde also stated that she talked about the matter to her co-actress Saumya Tandon. Shinde further said that after listening to the matter, Tandon's reply was: "No one rapes in our industry, Shilpa". Shinde stated that Benaifer Kohli tried to bury the matter and threatened her. Tandon responded to Shinde's statement:

In April 2017, actress Sameeksha Singh, who worked with producers Binaifer Kholi and Sanjay Kholi in their serial Zaara, stated that she was in the same situation when she was working with them. She said Sanjay Kohli used to flirt with her but his actions were unacceptable in Shinde's situation.
Television actress Kavita Kaushik who worked with Sanjay Kohli on his show FIR, questioned why Shinde was quiet for one year and accused her of being a bad example for other girls. Shinde replied that she was facing many problems at that time and that it is difficult to publicly address sexual harassment.

In April 2017, Benaifer Kohli and Sanjay Kohli registered a case against Shinde for defamation.

On 13 February 2018, Shinde stated the show's makers had approached her and requested her to finish the matter and she had retracted her FIR against Sanjay Kohli.

References

External links
 Bhabi Ji Ghar Par Hai! on &TV
 Bhabi Ji Ghar Par Hai! on ZEE5
 

&TV original programming
2015 Indian television series debuts
Hindi comedy shows
Hindi language television sitcoms
Indian comedy television series
Indian television sitcoms
Television shows set in Uttar Pradesh